Joel Vartiainen (born 14 March 1994) is a Finnish footballer.

Career
In 2014, Vartiainen moved to the Finnish third division side SC Kuopio Futis-98 after playing for KuPS in the Finnish top flight. After that, he played college soccer for University of Central Florida.

References

External links
 

Finnish footballers
Living people
1994 births
Association football defenders
Kuopion Palloseura players
SC Kuopio Futis-98 players
Veikkausliiga players
Kakkonen players